The 2015 Pulitzer Prizes were awarded by the Pulitzer Prize Board for work during the 2014 calendar year. Prize winners and nominated finalists were announced on April 20, 2015.

Prizes

Journalism

Letters, Drama, and Music

References

Pulitzer Prizes by year
Pulitzer Prize
Pulitzer
Pulitzer
Pulitzer
April 2015 events in the United States